Sven "Uttern" Ludvig Utterström (16 May 1901 – 7 May 1979) was a Swedish skier who competed in cross-country skiing.

He was born in Boden, Sweden, raced for Bodens BK, and won several medals at the Winter Olympics, the FIS Nordic World Ski Championships, and the Holmenkollen ski festival.

Utterström won the 50 km cross-country event at the Holmenkollen ski festival in 1929 and 1930.  He was only the third non-Norwegian to win any event there (Finland's Anton Collin and Martti Lappalainen were the first two, winning the 50 km in 1922 and 1928, respectively.).

At the 1928 Winter Olympics he finished ninth in the 18 km competition.

Four years later at the 1932 Winter Olympics, Utterström won the 18 km. In the 50 km event he finished sixth.

In 1930, he won the 50 km at the FIS Nordic World Ski Championships and was on the 4 × 10 km relay that won the inaugural event at the 1933 Nordic skiing World Championships. He also won a silver in the 50 km at the 1933 event as well.

Utterström also won the Svenska Dagbladet Gold Medal in 1929 (Shared with Gillis Grafström).

Cross-country skiing results
All results are sourced from the International Ski Federation (FIS).

Olympic Games
 1 medal – (1 gold)

World Championships
 3 medals – (2 gold, 1 silver)

References

External links

Holmenkollen winners since 1892 - click Vinnere for downloadable pdf file 

1901 births
1979 deaths
People from Boden Municipality
Cross-country skiers from Norrbotten County
Swedish male cross-country skiers
Olympic cross-country skiers of Sweden
Cross-country skiers at the 1928 Winter Olympics
Cross-country skiers at the 1932 Winter Olympics
Olympic gold medalists for Sweden
Holmenkollen Ski Festival winners
Vasaloppet winners
Olympic medalists in cross-country skiing
FIS Nordic World Ski Championships medalists in cross-country skiing
Medalists at the 1932 Winter Olympics